The Národní liga ragby is the second level of domestic club rugby union in the Czech Republic, below the first division, the Extraliga ragby. There is also one club from Slovakia in the league.

The season runs from mid-September to the end of May.

History
The league started out as the Druhá Liga (Second League), but was renamed the První Liga (First League) in the 1999-2000 season. For sponsorship reasons it has been called KB První Liga until the 2015/16 season.

Current teams
2012–13 season

Champions

    
Czech
1993 establishments in the Czech Republic
Sports leagues established in 1993